The following is a list of East Tennessee State Buccaneers men's basketball head coaches. There have been 18 head coaches of the Buccaneers in their 104-season history.

East Tennessee State's current head coach is Brooks Savage. He was hired as the Buccaneers' head coach in March 2023, replacing Desmond Oliver, who was fired after the 2022–23 season.

References

East Tennessee State

East Tennessee State Buccaneers men's basketball coaches